'Plamil Foods' Is a British manufacturer of vegan food products. Founded in 1965, the company has produced and pioneered soy milk, egg free mayonnaise, pea based milk, yogurts, confection bars and chocolate. 

The company began life in 1956 as the Plantmilk Society, which was set up by Leslie Cross, vice-president of the British Vegan Society, to explore how to produce a commercial soy milk as an alternative to dairy for vegans and others. Plamil became the first company in the UK, and one of the first in the Western world, to make soy milk widely available.

Plant milk

Plant milks have been produced for hundreds of years, particularly in China. According to the Soyinfo Center, almond milk ("Almaund mylke") was first mentioned in English in The Forme of Cury (c. 1390). There are early Western mentions of milk from the soy bean in June 1896 in the American Journal of Pharmacy and July 1897 in the United States Department of Agriculture's Farmer's Bulletin.

The first soy milk and soy-based infant formula in the West was developed in 1909 by John Ruhräh, an American paediatrician. Bottled soy milk was available commercially in China from the 1920s, and in 1931 Seventh-day Adventists in Madison, Tennessee, began production of soy milk fortified with calcium. In 1940 Vitasoy in Hong Kong began selling soy milk door to door. According to the Soyinfo Center, in the US the dairy industry put pressure on producers to call it something other than milk; one company used the term Soya Lac instead.

History

Plantmilk Society
Plamil Foods began life as the Plantmilk Society, which was founded in June 1956 by Leslie Cross (1914 – 2 December 1979), vice-president of the Vegan Society. The Vegan Society emerged in 1944 as a result of a split within the British Vegetarian Society over whether vegetarians should consume dairy products and eggs. Cross, who became a vegan in 1942, wrote regularly about the issue to the society's magazine, the Vegetarian Messenger, arguing that dairy-milk production was cruel and exploitative.

One of the early concerns of the Vegan Society was how to produce a commercial plant milk. In the spring of 1956, Cross placed an article in The Vegan proposing the creation of the Veganmilk Association. The aim would be to "produce and make available to the general public in Great Britain a milk, the ingredients of which would be of plant origin; which would satisfy nutritional requirements; and which would be palatable, attractive, and simple to use for the purposes for which dairy milk is now used."

Members decided to call it the Plantmilk Society. The London Evening News carried a story about the new society, under the headline "Now your milk may come from a plant." C. Arthur Ling (1919–2005) became the chair, and Leslie Cross the treasurer and secretary. (As of 2015 one of C. Arthur Ling's sons, Adrian, is the managing director of Plamil Foods.) The first annual general meeting was held on 6 October 1956 at Friends' House in Euston Road, London.

Plantmilk Ltd
It took several years of research and an investment of £20,000 to produce the soy milk, which was fortified with calcium and vitamins B2, B12 and D2. In 1965 the society became a limited company, Plantmilk Ltd, with Cross as its first full-time employee, and began production of its milk, which it called Plamil, from a rented factory in Iver, Buckinghamshire. A group of 16 vegans later took out loans to buy the freehold of a factory in Folkestone, Kent. In 1972 the company changed its name to Plamil Foods. During the 1970s, echoing the pressure brought by the American dairy industry in the 1930s, the company was not allowed in England to refer to its product as "soya milk," but had to call it "liquid food of plant origin," and thereafter "soya plantmilk."

Products
Plamil products are suitable for vegans and are made by the company in its own factory. The company is a "free from" producer and is sought out by people with allergies, as well as by vegans. Their organic chocolate products are registered with the Soil Association. Their products were registered with the Vegan Society until 2009, but Plamil withdrew its support of the society's trademark after the latter agreed to certify products that might contain trace amounts of dairy milk, eggs or fish, as a result of contamination during manufacturing. Since then Plamil has used its own vegan logo, rather than the society's.

The company sells a range of chocolate products to chocolate manufacturers, food industry, food service and wholesale under its Plamil Vegan Chocolat brand and website as well as a range of seasonal and non seasonal retail products under its Plamil So free brand and website.  Products are available online from the company's website, Animal Aid and Amazon, and as of 2015 are sold by Waitrose and Holland & Barrett.

See also
 Alpro
 List of vegetarian and vegan companies
 Silk (soy milk)
 So Good (soy beverage)

References

Further reading
 Plamil Foods.
 Cross, Leslie J. "Man and Nature", The Vegan, Summer 1948, pp. 6–8 (also available here).

1965 establishments in England
British companies established in 1965 
Food and drink companies established in 1965
Food and drink companies of England
Vegetarian companies and establishments of the United Kingdom
Companies based in Kent
Condiment companies
Folkestone